George Vladimirovitch Shervashidze (born 1894 in Vladimir, d. 1978 in Sofia), titular Prince of Abkhazia from 1968 after the death of his uncle.

He was a captain of the Russian army and fought in the First World War. He participated in the Yaroslavl uprising against the Bolsheviks and later emigrated to Bulgaria. He was married to Tatiana Afanasyevna Bendereva who was a doctor, born in Tbilisi in 1901.

See also
List of Princes of Abkhazia

References

External links
Abaza Duney (Russian)

|-

|-

|-

1894 births
1978 deaths
Abkhazian nobility
Bulgarian people of Russian descent
Imperial Russian Army personnel
White Russian emigrants to Bulgaria
Emigrants from the Russian Empire to Bulgaria
Georgian emigrants to Bulgaria
George Vladimirovitch